The Honda CRF450L (known as CRF450RL since 2020) is a CRF series  dual-sport motorcycle made by Honda. It was announced in May 2018 and available from September of the same year. It is the fifth member of CRF dual-sport lineup (-L suffix) offered by Honda, after CRF230L, CRF250L, CRF1000L Africa Twin and CRF150L. Unlike other bikes from this lineup, the frame and engine of the CRF450L are directly taken from CRF450R motocross and CRF450X enduro bikes, while the other bikes such as CRF150L and CRF250L do not share anything from its motocross and enduro counterparts.

The CRF450L Rally concept bike inspired from the CRF450 Rally Dakar racer was showcased at the November 2018 EICMA.

References

External links 
 

Crf450l
Off-road motorcycles
Dual-sport motorcycles
Motorcycles introduced in 2018